Lifted may refer to:

Films
 Lifted (2006 film), a Pixar computer animated short film
 Lifted (2010 film), a film directed by Lexi Alexander

Albums
 Lifted (CDB album), 1997
 Lifted (Dallas Smith album), 2014
 Lifted (Israel Nash album), 2018
 Lifted or The Story Is in the Soil, Keep Your Ear to the Ground, a 2002 album by Bright Eyes

Songs
 "Lifted" (Lighthouse Family song), 1995
 "Lifted", a song by Suicide Silence that appears on their 2009 album No Time to Bleed
 "Lifted" (Naughty Boy song), 2013, featuring Emeli Sandé
 "Lifted" (Dallas Smith song), 2015
 "Lifted" (CL song), 2016

Other
 Lifted Research Group, an Orange County-based clothing brand